Pyari Xaxa (born 18 May 1997) is an Indian women's international footballer who plays as a forward for Odisha FC and the India national team.

Club career
Xaxa began her football career with the club Kunwarmunda based in her home State of Odisha. In 2016, she was signed by Rising Student to play in the inaugural season of the Indian Women's League. She finished the season with 14 goals, with ten in the preliminary and four in the final round. Her team lost to Eastern Sporting Union in the final.

International career
Xaxa made her senior international debut in 2015 after playing in the India U19 team. She was awarded the AIFF Emerging Woman Footballer of the Year for the year. She was a part of the team that won gold medal at the 2016 South Asian Games in Shillong.

International goals

Honours
India
 South Asian Games Gold medal: 2016

Rising Students
 Indian Women's League: 2017–18

Odisha
 National Games Silver medal: 2022

Individual
 AIFF Emerging Woman Footballer of the Year: 2015
 Indian Football Fans' Player of the Year 2020–21

References

External links 
 Pyari Xaxa at All India Football Federation
 

Living people
1997 births
People from Sundergarh district
India women's international footballers
India women's youth international footballers
Indian women's footballers
Women's association football forwards
Footballers from Odisha
Sportswomen from Odisha
Odisha FC Women players
Indian Women's League players
21st-century Indian women
21st-century Indian people
South Asian Games gold medalists for India
South Asian Games medalists in football